Patrick Scibilio (born 22 February 2000), is an Australian professional footballer who plays as a defender for Sydney FC. On 21 May 2019 he made his professional debut in the 2019 AFC Champions League in a group stage match against Kawasaki Frontale.

References

External links

2000 births
Living people
Australian soccer players
Association football defenders
Sydney FC players
National Premier Leagues players